Beard–Eaves–Memorial Coliseum is a 10,500-seat multi-purpose arena on the campus of Auburn University in Auburn, Alabama. The arena, which opened in 1969, is best known as the former home of the Auburn men's and women's basketball, women's gymnastics, and wrestling teams. The teams finished their stays at the facility at the end of the 2009–10 season, with all of its tenants moving into the new Auburn Arena opening in time for the 2010–11 season. In addition to sports, numerous concerts were held in the facility. The coliseum continues to house athletics offices as well as classrooms and office space for Auburn's Department of Geosciences.

The building's exterior is primarily nondescript concrete, but its entry plaza was recognizable for the large "War Eagle" statue which faced not only the rest of the university, but also nearby Jordan–Hare Stadium.

Naming history

The building was approved by the state legislature in 1965 to replace the Auburn Sports Arena, a small on-campus building in use from 1946 until the building of the Coliseum. The state supplied the majority of the funds, with the federal government, the University and an athletics department pledge drive making up the rest of the $6,033,597 needed.  It was originally named the Memorial Coliseum, in memory of the Auburn war dead of the 20th century.

The coliseum opened January 11, 1969 for a basketball game against Louisiana State University. Auburn upset the Pistol Pete Maravich-led LSU team.

In 1987, it was renamed for Joel H. Eaves, a former basketball player and coach who guided the Tigers to their first Southeastern Conference title in 1960 and is the school's all-time winningest coach. It received its current name six years later, adding the name of Jeff Beard, athletic director from 1951 to 1972 during some of Auburn's best years athletically.

Originally, the arena seated 12,500 people. It was downsized to 10,108 in 1994 when offices were created removing several rows at the top of the end seating areas. Since 1998, it has seated 10,500.

Notable events

On March 25–27, 1971, the Memorial Coliseum hosted the 41st Annual NCAA Wrestling Championships.

On March 5, 1974, Elvis Presley performed a sold-out show at the Memorial Coliseum.

See also
Auburn Arena
Jordan–Hare Stadium
Samford Stadium – Hitchcock Field at Plainsman Park

References

 Auburn University Athletic Department (2001). Beard–Eaves–Memorial Coliseum. Retrieved June 6, 2005.

External links
Beard–Eaves–Memorial Coliseum at AuburnTigers.com

Auburn Tigers basketball venues
Basketball venues in Alabama
Defunct college basketball venues in the United States
College wrestling venues in the United States
Handball venues in the United States
Sports venues completed in 1969
1969 establishments in Alabama